The Union Signal (formerly, The Woman's Temperance Union, Our Union) is a defunct American newspaper, established in 1883 in Chicago, Illinois. Focused on temperance, it was the organ of the Woman's Christian Temperance Union (WCTU), at one time, the largest women's organization in the United States. Initially, a weekly 16-page illustrated newspaper, it shifted location (Evanston, Illinois) and publishing schedule (to bimonthly to monthly to quarterly) before it ceased publication in 2016.

In 1880, Matilda Carse started The Signal. Three years later, it merged with another newspaper to become The Union Signal. The last edition of the WCTU's quarterly journal, titled The Union Signal, was published in 2015, the main focus of which was current research and information on drugs.

Editors have included: Mary Bannister Willard (January 1883 - July 1885), Mary Allen West (July 1885 - 1892), Frances Willard (1892 - February 1898), Lillian M. N. Stevens (February 1898 - April 1914), Anna Adams Gordon (April 1914 - October 1926), Ella Boole (October 1926 - October 1933), Ida B. Wise Smith (October 1933 - ).

Origin and history
At the first National Convention of the WCTU, held at Cleveland, Ohio, in 1874, a committee was appointed to consider the establishment of a paper as the organ of the union. This committee consisted of Annie Turner Wittenmyer, Pennsylvania; Mrs. S. J. Steele, Wisconsin; Mrs. S. A. Gifford, Massachusetts; Mrs. E. E. Marcy, Illinois; Miss Emma Janes, California, and Mrs. Mary Coffin Johnson, New York. Being unable to formulate definite plans before the close of the convention, the committee was given full power to act.

At the second annual convention, held at Cincinnati, Ohio, in 1875, Mrs. E. E. Marcy, secretary of the Committee on Publication Interests, reported that, after overcoming the various hindrances incident to such an enterprise, the project of publishing an official organ had been inaugurated the previous June. The paper was called The Woman's Temperance Union, and six numbers had been issued up to the time of the convention. Wittenmyer, as chairman of the committee, was the active publisher, with Jennie Fowler Willing as editor and Johnson and Frances Willard as contributing editors. This report included resolutions drafted by the Committee on Publication Interests, one of which was as follows:—

Whereas, The paper published by the National Temperance Union as its organ is one of the strongest bonds to hold together our interests in separate localities, devoted as it is to our work,
Resolved, That we, as delegates, pledge ourselves a certain number of subscribers in our several states, and in case of failure, to raise money to cover the amount subscribed.

Johnson became the publisher at this time, with Mary Towne Burt as her assistant, and, later, her successor. Willing continued as editor until the Newark Convention in 1876, when Margaret E. Winslow was elected editor, with Mrs. S. K. Bolton, Ohio; Mrs. Helen E. Brown, New York; Mary Torrans Lathrap, Michigan; Julia Colman, New York; Willing, Illinois; Johnson, New York, and Frances Willard, Illinois, as contributing editors.

In 1877, the name of the paper was changed to Our Union, and at the fourth annual meeting held in Chicago, the publisher's report showed an indebtedness on the paper. Frances Willard then moved that the secretary proceed to call the roll of the states, and the delegates respond and pledge the number of subscribers they would become responsible for the ensuing year. Pledges totalling 12,957 were received, and enthusiasm prevailed. Among the recommendations for the year's work was one relating to Our Union which read: "Each state will be expected to pledge itself, through its delegates, for a specified number of copies. Our local unions have come up nobly to the rescue, but we expect a largely increased enthusiasm in the year to come."

At the Convention of 1878, held in Baltimore, the Publishing Committee reported that the paper had come through the year free from debt and with a small balance in the treasury. This report, signed by Frances Willard, Jane M. Geddes, Caroline Brown Buell, and Esther Pugh, closed with the following exhortation:— "We feel that, in the interests of Our Union, we must urge this Convention to impress upon the local auxiliaries that they have one National official organ, and one only; since there are other papers prominently circulated and largely subscribed for by temperance women, which are by many supposed to be equally entitled to their patronage, which, as our experience proves, interfere greatly with the circulation of Our Union. Having laid before our sisters such phases of the paper as the year's experience has developed we ask them to consider, prayerfully and with all due deliberation, their duty to a paper which is endeared to us as to them by long and earnest labors on its behalf."

In 1883, Our Union was consolidated with The Signal, a temperance paper owned and published in Chicago by the Woman's Temperance Publishing Association. The Signal had represented the WCTU's rapidly growing work in the west for a period of three years. Mary Bannister Willard was its editor, a position which she retained when the consolidation was effected. The Union Signal made its first appearance January 4, 1883. For twenty years thereafter, the organ was owned and published by the Woman's Temperance Publishing Association of Chicago, which association had full control of the paper financially, its editorial policy being, controlled by the National WCTU. On October 10, 1903, the paper was bought outright by the National WCTU and thereafter was edited and published at National Headquarters in Evanston.

The thought and the hope of the early workers for this publication were hoped to inspire the women of future years. The keynote for that goal was sounded by Stevens, National President and editor-in-chief, at Los Angeles, California, 1905, when she said:— "I must insist that it is not too much to expect that each local union should maintain a subscription list equal in number to one fourth of its membership. Those unions which have reached this point are to be congratulated, not alone because they have conformed to this request, but because of the great uplift which must inevitably come to a local union and to a community through the liberal reading of The Union Signal."

Name and motto

Not only did the paper's name change after the merger, at least in one year, 1894, it dropped the word "The" from its masthead, to read Union Signal.

The paper's motto changed numerous times:
 1883: Official organ of the Woman's National Christian Temperance Union.
 1889 and 1890: Official organ of the World's and National Woman's Christian Temperance Union
 1893, 1895, and 1898: And World's White Ribbon.
 1903: For God And Home and Every Land. (upper left); National and World's Woman's Christian Temperance Union (upper right); And World's White Ribbon (lower center). 
 1910 and 1912: (no motto)
 1913, 1914, 1915, 1917, 1921, and 1922: Official Organ National Woman's Christian Temperance Union

Notable people

 Jessie Ackermann
 Ella Boole
 Caroline Brown Buell
 Adda Burch
 Mary Towne Burt
 Matilda Carse
 Clara Christiana Morgan Chapin
 Julia Colman
 Mary G. Charlton Edholm
 Anna Adams Gordon
 Eva Kinney Griffith
 Cornelia Templeton Hatcher
 Emeline Harriet Howe
 Therese A. Jenkins
 Mary Coffin Johnson
 Mary Torrans Lathrap
 Mary Greenleaf Clement Leavitt
 Esther Pugh
 Anna Rankin Riggs
 Lillian M. N. Stevens
 Katharine Lent Stevenson
 Jane Agnes Stewart
 Missouri H. Stokes
 Margaret Ashmore Sudduth
 Mary Allen West
 Dora V. Wheelock
 Frances Willard
 Mary Bannister Willard
 Jennie Fowler Willing
 Margaret E. Winslow
 Ida B. Wise
 Annie Turner Wittenmyer
 Lenna Lowe Yost

References

Woman's Christian Temperance Union
Newspapers published in Illinois
English-language newspapers
Wikipedia categories named after newspapers
Defunct newspapers published in Chicago
1883 establishments in the United States
2016 disestablishments in the United States